Srinagaria (or Srinagariya) is a dialect of Garhwali, belonging to the Central Pahari group (per Grierson). It is primarily spoken in the region around Srinagar in the Pauri Garhwal district of Uttarakhand state and is regarded as the standard form of Garhwali.

Script & specimen

Comparative analysis

References

Northern Indo-Aryan languages
Languages of Uttarakhand